KHBM may refer to:

 KHBM (AM), a radio station (1430 AM) licensed to Monticello, Arkansas, United States
 KHBM-FM, a radio station (93.7 FM) licensed to Monticello, Arkansas, United States